Krokolithidae is an oofamily of fossil crocodylomorph eggs. The oogenus Mycomorphoolithus is closely related to the family, but not included in it.

References

Prehistoric crocodylomorphs
Reptile trace fossils
Egg fossils